Octavio Andrés Alesi Gonzaléz (born 10 December 1986, Barinas) is an Olympic swimmer from Venezuela.

Participation 
He swam for Venezuela at the:
Olympics: 2008, 2012
World Championships: 2003, 2007, 2009
Pan American Games: 2003, 2007, 2011
Central American & Caribbean Games: 2006

References

1986 births
Living people
Venezuelan male swimmers
Venezuelan male freestyle swimmers
Male butterfly swimmers
Olympic swimmers of Venezuela
Swimmers at the 2008 Summer Olympics
Swimmers at the 2012 Summer Olympics
Swimmers at the 2003 Pan American Games
Swimmers at the 2007 Pan American Games
Swimmers at the 2011 Pan American Games
People from Barinas (state)
Pan American Games medalists in swimming
Pan American Games silver medalists for Venezuela
South American Games silver medalists for Venezuela
South American Games medalists in swimming
Central American and Caribbean Games gold medalists for Venezuela
Competitors at the 2002 South American Games
Competitors at the 2006 Central American and Caribbean Games
Central American and Caribbean Games medalists in swimming
Medalists at the 2003 Pan American Games
Medalists at the 2007 Pan American Games
Medalists at the 2011 Pan American Games
21st-century Venezuelan people